GTOPO30 is a digital elevation model for the world, developed by United States Geological Survey (USGS). It has a 30-arc second resolution (approximately 1 km),  and is split into 33 tiles stored in the USGS DEM file format.

According to DTED and USGS DEM the absolute vertical accuracy of GTOP30 varies from ±30 meters.

Gallery
This map is derived from GTOPO30 data that describes the elevation of Earth's terrain at intervals of 30 arcseconds (approximately 1 km).  It uses hypsometric tints instead of contour lines to indicate elevation.

See also 
 Shuttle Radar Topography Mission
 Advanced Spaceborne Thermal Emission and Reflection Radiometer

References

External links 
 GTOPO30 Page.

Digital elevation models